Nikolai Hængsle (previously Nikolai Hængsle Eilertsen; born 24 June 1978) is a Norwegian bass guitarist. He is primarily known as a member of BigBang (1999–2004, 2009–present) and The National Bank (2004–present). Eilertsen, who was born in Skotselv, also participates in the bands Lester, Needlepoint and Elephant9.

Honors
Spellemannprisen 2004 in the class Pop band for the album The National Bank
Spellemannprisen 2010 in the class Jazz for the album Walk the Nile

Discography
Contributions by Nikolai Eilertsen:
With Bigbang
Albums:
Electric Psalmbook (Grand Sport Records, 1999)
Clouds Rolling by (Warner Music, 2000)
Frontside Rock'n'Roll (Warner Music Norway, 2002)
Radio Radio TV Sleep (Warner Music Norway, 2003), live
Poetic Terrorism (Grand Sport Records, 2005)
Too Much Yang (Grand Sport Records, 2007)
Something Special – The Best of Bigbang (Grand Sport Records, 2005), compilation
From Acid to Zen (Oglio Records, 2008)
Edendale (Oglio Records, 2009)
Epic Scrap Metal (Grand Sport Records, 2011)

EP's:
Girl in Oslo (Warner Music Norway, 2000)
New Glow (Warner Music Norway, 2000)
Smiling for (Warner Music Norway, 2001)
Not A Rolling Stone (Grand Sport Records, 2005)
Fly Like A Butterfly Sting Like A Bee (Grand Sport Records, 2005)
Saturn Freeway (Glitterhouse Records, 2006)
Hurricane Boy (Grand Sport Records, 2007)
Wild Bird E.P. (Grand Sport Records, 2008)
Isabel (Grand Sport Records, 2009)

With The National Bank
The National Bank (2004)
Come On Over to the Other Side (2008)

With Thomas Dybdahl
Science (Universal Music Norway, 2006)

With Knut Reiersrud Band
Voodoo Without Killing Chicken (2008)

With Knut Reiersrud
Gitar (Universal Music, 2009)

With Bjørn Eidsvåg
Pust (Petroleum Records/Sony Music, 2008)

With Lester
This Village (Deaf Ear/Mudi, 2008)

With Elephant9
Dodovoodoo (Rune Grammofon, 2008)
Walk the Nile (Rune Grammofon, 2010)
Live at the BBC (Rune Grammofon, 2011)
Atlantis (Rune Grammofon, 2012), with Reine Fiske

With Needlepoint
The Woods Are Not What They Seem (BJK Music/Musikkoperatørene, 2010)
Outside The Screen (BJK Music/Musikkoperatørene, 2012)
Aimless Mary (BJK Music/Musikkoperatørene, 2015)

With Band of Gold including Nina Elisabeth Mortvedt
Band of Gold (Jansen Plateproduksjon, 2015)

With various artists
Sivil Ulyd 2: Sivilarbeiderplata (Passive Fist Productions, 2003), compilation
''Susanne Sundfør – Ten Love Songs

References

External links
BigBang Official Website
The National Bank Official Website

1978 births
Living people
Norwegian male bass guitarists
21st-century Norwegian bass guitarists
21st-century Norwegian male musicians
The National Bank (band) members
Bigbang (Norwegian band) members
Needlepoint (band) members
Elephant9 members
People from Øvre Eiker